Knešpolje is a settlement within the municipality of Široki Brijeg, Bosnia and Herzegovina. In 1991, the settlement had a population of 1,110. It is located along the Mostar-Široki Brijeg roadway.

History
Knešpolje was first linked to Mostar by road in 1896 under what was then Austro-Hungarian rule. Knešpolje is the site of two World War II mass graves. The exhumation of these remains is set to begin in 2010.

Culture
The village is home to the Church of St. John the Baptist (Crkva sv. Ivana Krstitelja).

Population

According to the 2013 census, its population was 1,322.

References

Populated places in Široki Brijeg